Edward Percy Prendergast (20 August 1893 – 13 May 1967) was an Australian rules footballer who played with Collingwood in the Victorian Football League (VFL).

Notes

External links 

Ted Prendergast's profile at Collingwood Forever

1893 births
1967 deaths
Australian rules footballers from Victoria (Australia)
Collingwood Football Club players